The fat-tailed gerbil (Pachyuromys duprasi), also called the duprasi gerbil or doop, is a rodent belonging to the subfamily Gerbillinae. It is the only member of the genus Pachyuromys. These rodents are the most docile species of the gerbil subfamily. Fat-tailed gerbils have been available on the pet market for decades, but in the 21st century breeders can be hard to find. They are sometimes considered as pocket pets.

Other common English names are: fat-tailed jird, fat-tailed rat, and beer mat gerbil.

Description 

The fat-tailed gerbil is a medium-sized gerbil. The hair at the back and the head is yellow-coloured, with a dark grey base and a small black tip. The belly is white. Their body is round and somewhat flattened. They have no clear neck and a very sharp face, with large oval-shaped black eyes. The ears are positioned quite low, which gives the fat-tailed gerbil a fox-like head. The legs are comparatively short for a gerbil. They look similar to a dwarf hamster, but unlike a hamster they have a pointed snout and a fat, almost bald, club-shaped tail from which they get their common name of 'fat-tailed gerbil'. The fat-tailed gerbil stores fat in its tail in the same way that the camel stores fat in its hump. A healthy fat-tailed gerbil should have a nicely rounded tail.

Lifespan 
Captive specimens of the fat-tailed gerbil have an average life span of between 2 and 4 years – although a possible lifespan as long as 7 years has been suggested in some reports. In the wild, they are unlikely to reach this age.

Origin 

The French zoologist Fernand Lataste discovered Pachyuromys duprasi in 1880 in Laghouat, Algeria.

Fat-tailed gerbils are native to the Northern Sahara (North-western Egypt, Libya, Tunisia, and Algeria). There they live in sparsely vegetated sand sheets or rocky deserts. In the wild, fat-tailed gerbils live in simple burrows about one meter deep, in hard sandy soil. They may also occupy other species' burrows.

Food 

Fat-tailed gerbils are mostly insectivorous in the wild, but will eat also a variety of plants. In captivity, they are kept on normal basic rodent mix, used to feed Mongolian gerbils or hamsters. They are particularly fond of mealworms, crickets, moths, and almost any other insect, even beetles. They can also be given some vegetables and fruit, like carrots, cauliflower, chicory, and apples. Because fat-tailed gerbils originated in dry areas and are not used to food which has high moisture content, they can get diarrhea after eating too much fruit and vegetable matter. Branches and twigs are rich in vitamins and very suitable besides their basic food, especially in winter. Because their teeth keep growing their whole life, gnawing on these can keep their incisors at the right length. Hay is also very good for fat-tailed gerbils because of its high fibre content.

Housing 

Fat-tailed gerbils can be kept in a tank (aquarium or terrarium) measuring at least , housing one or two gerbils. Fat-tailed gerbils are fond of digging, and so a thick layer of bedding is generally provided, typically of wood shavings (excluding fresh pine or red cedar wood shavings, as many rodents react to them and develop respiratory problems). Cardboard-based substrates are also considered suitable.

Fat-tailed gerbils benefit from regular dust bathing to help prevent their fur from appearing greasy, although some will naturally appear somewhat greasy. Fat-tailed gerbils will make a nest; this may be underground in their burrow, on the surface in the substrate, or in a nesting box. Fat-tailed gerbils enclosures can be enriched with various wooden or ceramic toys, with an exercise wheel of  minimum diameter considered necessary.

It is common to keep fat-tailed gerbils singly (as they often display aggression towards housemates). Only a small percentage of keepers house them in pairs because of this. Keeping a breeding pair can be somewhat difficult as most pairs will squabble when housed together; even if a breeding pair gets along well, they may not always produce pups.

Behaviour 
Wild fat-tailed gerbils are solitary animals, and sometimes live in colonies. In the wild, fat-tailed gerbils become active at dusk and this is the same in captivity - although they can sometimes appear to be diurnal. This gerbil species is active for some very short periods in between longer periods of sleep, and they are very deep sleepers. Fat-tailed gerbils are very docile and almost never bite. They have a habit of hitting out with their front feet when hiding under something which can look like 'trying to bite' - but isn't. People say that even wild fat-tailed gerbils that are trapped can even be handled right away without being bitten. They seem to lack the curiosity of the Mongolian gerbil, and behave more like a Syrian hamster. Fat-tailed gerbils spend a lot of time grooming their fur and washing their face. They like to dig a lot and dig in sand or other similar substrates. They also enjoy running on solid exercise wheels - so much so that it has become an essential part of their husbandry requirements.

When they fight, they shriek loudly and bite each other's tails. The mating ritual of the fat-tailed gerbil may also be confused with fighting.

Fat-tailed gerbils, like most other rodents, have scent glands on their stomach and engage in marking their territory by stretching out and rubbing their bellies on the ground and furnishings. Their scent markings don't seem to be discernible to people and there is no noticeable odour from their cage unlike hamsters or mice.

Breeding 
Fat-tailed gerbils are sexually mature when they are two months old (sometimes before) and in captivity they can reproduce the whole year round. The gestation period of the fat-tailed gerbil is 19 to 21 days. Their average litter size is three to six, and the pups are weaned at three to four weeks.

Breeding fat-tailed gerbils in captivity can be hard, as the females can be very aggressive when they are pregnant or nursing pups. They can attack the male, and even kill their mate if he is not housed separately after mating has taken place - although some can live together throughout. The chance of a female housed with a male becoming pregnant is much less than it is with Mongolian gerbils. A proven method to breed fat-tailed gerbils is putting a male and a female together in a rather small enclosure with nothing else in it than some bedding material. No nesting box, nothing to play with, no food dish. This way there is really nothing the animals can fight about. They can't become territorial because of the small space and because there are no points to use as demarcation. With this method it is needed to keep the male and female together for at least one week (or before the male exhibits serious injury) and then separate them. Female fat-tailed gerbils are able to rear their litter alone.

The mating ritual of the fat-tailed gerbil is rather unusual. Both males and females stand on their hind legs and wrestle, squeaking. They never seem to actually bite each other, but they get rather rowdy. If the female is not receptive and the male doesn't give up, the female will turn and kick bedding at the male or bite his tail, often making it bleed. The female will make a nest and may get a little nippy when she is ready to have her litter.

Sexing 
The difference between a male and a female fat-tailed gerbil is the same as with other small rodents. This difference can be seen at the distance between the urinary and anal openings. The distance between these openings in male fat-tailed gerbils is much larger than it is in females. Adult males have a large bulge at the base of the tail that is their scrotum so their testicles are clearly visible. This is totally absent from females. When the pups are about 2 weeks old the hairs on the belly start to grow and bald spots can be seen on the belly of the females. These are her nipples. These bald spots are absent in males.

Colour mutations 
It appeared that in Japan and other places (over 10 years ago) either a grey (g) or chinchilla (chm) mutation appeared. This fat-tailed gerbil was greyer in colour. But not everyone was not sure that it was a colour mutation. It was possible that these grey fat-tailed gerbils were from the Egyptian subspecies Pachyuromys duprasi natronensis. The juvenile coat of these gerbils was very grey but faded with age to a much more sandy colour. Some hybrids of the Egyptian and the Algerian subspecies have this grey coat as well, although it does lighten with age but is still greyish. Nothing else was known at the time, and has not since reappeared anywhere.

More recently (2021) there have been images circulating online of 2 white duprasi pups of which little is known currently. They are potentially leucistic in appearance.

Purchase 
Duprasi are very rare in the pet market, so they are not available in many places. In some countries they are not available; in others they are rare (Germany, France, Denmark, US and the UK), but in some countries, like the Netherlands, they are quite common. Occasionally, they can be found in a pet shop, but most won't have them.

Ailments 
A healthy fat-tailed gerbil has bright eyes, is lively, and has a soft coat. They are dry and clean. Sick fat-tailed gerbils get lethargic and are not lively, also their tails can look deflated. Preventing illnesses is usually more effective than curing, especially for the fat-tailed gerbil; curing them is usually difficult. Fat-tailed gerbils are so small that even vets do not always know how they must treat the animal. Catching a cold can be fatal, although the biggest threats for a fat-tailed gerbil are draught and moisture. Hyperthermia, improper diet, and stress can lead to health problems. Not much is known about diseases of fat-tailed gerbils, because this small rodent has not been kept as a pet that long and often. But small rodents often have generally the husbandry-related ailments. An ailment that can often can be seen in fat-tailed gerbils are bite wounds at their tail, because fighting fat-tailed gerbils try to bite in each other's tail. Teeth trouble is quite common too and can cause sore eyes, weight loss and over-grooming of the face.

References

 
 Cope, E. Duprasi. e-gerbil. Accessed October 11, 2005 at https://web.archive.org/web/20070122210738/http://www.sensi-media.com/gerbil/duprasi.htm
 Maas, P. 2004. "Fat-tailed Gerbil Page" (On-line), The Mongolian Gerbil Website. Retrieved October 11, 2005.
 Barker, S. 2004. "Pachyuromys duprasi" (On-line), Animal Diversity Web. Retrieved October 11, 2005

External links
Overview of Fat-tailed Gerbils
e-gerbil,Duprasi page
The National Gerbil Society UK - Fat-Tailed Gerbil
Gerbil Information Page - Fat-Tailed Gerbil (Duprasi)

fat-tailed gerbil
Rodents of North Africa
Fauna of the Sahara
fat-tailed gerbil
Taxa named by Fernand Lataste